The Denver Times was a daily newspaper in Denver, Colorado during 1872 to 1926.  It was merged into the Rocky Mountain News in 1926.

References

Defunct newspapers published in Colorado
Daily newspapers published in the United States
Publications established in 1872
Publications disestablished in 1926